Slobozia, also known as Slobodzeya, is a city in the Republic of Moldova under the de facto control of the unrecognized Pridnestrovian Moldavian Republic. It is the seat of the Slobozia District of Transnistria.

Slobozia is located in the southern part of Transnistria, south of Tiraspol. It had a population of 18,748 at the census in 1989, and 16,062 at the census in 2004. The population of the city is mostly made up of ethnic Moldavians (46%) and Russians (41%), while Ukrainians are an important minority (11%).

The name of the city comes from the Romanian "slobozie", meaning "a tax-free colony (village)".

Climate
Slobozia has a humid continental climate (Köppen: Dfb bordering on Dfa).

Notable people 

 Petru Bogatu (born 1951 in Slobozia) is a Moldovan journalist and author
 Vasili Tishchenko, mayor 
 Vladimir Ţurcan (born 1954 in Slobozia) is a Moldovan politician and member of the Parliament of Moldova since 2009.

References

External links 
 Słobodzieja (Slobozia) in the Geographical Dictionary of the Kingdom of Poland (1889)

Cities and towns in Transnistria
Cities and towns in Moldova
Populated places on the Dniester
Tiraspolsky Uyezd
Slobozia District